Daniil Vadimovich Tarasov (born 27 March 1999) is a Russian professional ice hockey goaltender for the  Columbus Blue Jackets in the National Hockey League (NHL). He was drafted 86th overall by the Columbus Blue Jackets in the third round of the 2017 NHL Entry Draft.

Early life 

Tarasov was born in Novokuznetsk, Kemerovo Oblast; his father, Vadim, was a goaltender for Metallurg Novokuznetsk in the Russian Superleague (RSL) when he was born. Tarasov started skating when he was three years old. When he was seven years old, his family moved to Ufa after Tarasov's father signed with the Salavat Yulaev Ufa in 2006. He joined the Salavat Yulaev's sports school, starting as a defenceman before making the change to goaltender at the age of eight.

Playing career

Junior 

On 16 November 2015, Tarasov made his Junior Hockey League (MHL) debut with Tolpar Ufa in a 6–4 win against the Chaika Nizhny Novgorod. He missed the following MHL season after he received surgery on his tibia for a tumor. He returned for the next season for Tolpar Ufa, earning the starting goaltending position with 40 games played and a 1.85 GAA and .928 SV%.

Professional 
Tarasov was selected 86th overall in the third round of the 2017 NHL Entry Draft by the Columbus Blue Jackets. On 10 September 2018, Tarasov made his professional debut for the Toros Neftekamsk of the Supreme Hockey League (VHL) in a 6–1 win against the KRS-BSU. On 9 January 2019, he recorded his first professional shutout in a 2–0 win against the Bars Kazan. In his Kontinental Hockey League (KHL) debut for the Salavat Yulaev, he recorded his first KHL shutout in a 3–0 win against the Admiral Vladivostok on 14 February 2019. He played 25 games with a 1.71 GAA and .928 SV% in his rookie professional season for the Toros, en route to winning Best Rookie in the VHL and a semi-final appearance in the 2019 Petrov Cup playoffs. After the 2018–19 season, the Salavat Yulaev offered him a contract in the KHL, however, Tarasov refused their offer.

On 4 May 2019, the Columbus Blue Jackets signed Tarasov to a three-year entry-level contract. He was loaned to Ässät in Liiga for the 2019–20 season, playing 41 games with 2.72 GAA and a .899 SV%. Because of the COVID-19 pandemic, he split his time between Salavat Yulaev in the KHL and the Blue Jackets' AHL affiliate, the Cleveland Monsters. On 3 April 2021, he made his North American professional debut for the Monsters in a 4–2 win against the Grand Rapid Griffins. He missed time in the 2021–22 AHL season after testing positive for COVID-19.

Tarasov entered the 2021–22 AHL season as the Monsters' starting goaltender. After both Blue Jackets goaltenders were out with an illness, on 2 December 2021, Tarasov made his NHL debut on an emergency call-up with 34 saves in a 3–2 loss against the Dallas Stars.

Tarasov earned his first-career NHL win on October 23, 2022 in Madison Square Garden when the Blue Jackets defeated the New York Rangers 5–1. He made 30 saves in the win. Tarasov is not the first Blue Jackets goalie to earn his first NHL win in MSG; his comes just under two years after Matīss Kivlenieks recorded his first NHL win in the same arena. Throughout the 2022–23 season, Tarasov has been splitting time between the Cleveland Monsters and Columbus Blue Jackets, backing up goalies Elvis Merzļikins and Joonas Korpisalo while they dealt with injury. On November 20, 2022, Tarasov made 47 saves in a 5–3 win against the Florida Panthers. This is tied for second most by a Blue Jackets rookie goalie in a single game and most saves in a game by a rookie NHL goaltender this season.

International play 

One week prior to the 2016 IIHF World U18 Championships, a large portion of Russia men's national under-18 ice hockey team tested positive for meldonium, which is considered a banned substance by the World Anti-Doping Agency (WADA); therefore, the entire under-18 team was replaced by the under-17 team, which included Tarasov, for the U18 World Championships. He was Russia's starting goaltender and was selected as one of the top three players on his team in the tournament. He also played for Russia men's national junior ice hockey team at the 2019 World Junior Ice Hockey Championships, winning a bronze medal, and Russia men's national ice hockey team at the 2019 Deutschland Cup.

Personal life 

Tarasov's father, Vadim, is a former professional goaltender who was drafted 196th overall by the Montreal Canadiens in the 1999 NHL Entry Draft and played 17 seasons in the RSL and KHL. He is the current goaltending coach for the Sibir Novosibirsk.

Tarasov's favourite goaltenders include Andrei Vasilevskiy, Sergei Bobrovsky, and Carey Price. After he was drafted by the Blue Jackets, he started learning English. He is married.

Career statistics

Regular season and playoffs

International

Awards and honors

References

External links 

 

1999 births
Living people
Ässät players
Cleveland Monsters players
Columbus Blue Jackets draft picks
Columbus Blue Jackets players
Russian ice hockey goaltenders
Salavat Yulaev Ufa players
Tolpar Ufa players
Toros Neftekamsk players
People from Novokuznetsk
Sportspeople from Kemerovo Oblast